Lemon Bay High School (LBHS) is a public high school located in Englewood, Florida, USA. It serves grades nine to twelve and is operated by Charlotte County Public Schools.

Lemon Bay High School takes students from Charlotte County, Lee County and Sarasota County because Englewood and Boca Grande are split between the three counties.

History and campus 

The school, named for Lemon Bay which is adjacent to the campus, opened in 1962 as an elementary school. In 1976, the school became a junior-senior high school, serving grades seven to ten. The school added 11th and 12th grades in 1980/81 after new building was completed. The first graduating class of seniors was in 1981. The school converted to a senior high school following the construction of L.A. Ainger Middle School in 1983.

A major renovation completed in 1987 gave the school a new administration wing, tennis courts and a track. A larger weight-room and a community swimming pool were added in 1988. In 1991, an auditorium was added and the media center was remodeled in 1993. The school has a track, American football field, baseball field, softball field, tennis courts, weightlifting room and two gymnasia.

The swimming pool was drained and filled with dirt in 2008. Later that year, the remaining concrete rim of the pool was demolished.

The school was featured in the second season of The Principal's Office, a reality television show on TruTv. The assistant principal Tammy Harvey and dean Jon Arritt appeared on the show.

The school was rebuilt using $80 million from stimulus funds.

Academics 
Standard English studies, mathematics, science and history courses are core requirements for all students and these four subjects can also be taken as Advanced Placement or honors level courses. Many elective courses are also available, including television production, drafting, information technology, journalism, Spanish language and physical education. As with all schools in Florida, Lemon Bay High School is evaluated yearly by the Florida Department of Education based on standardized testing. LBHS has received grades ranging from A to C, earning an A grade for the 2015–16 school year.

Extracurricular activities 

The school has a number of clubs and honorary societies available to students. These include the Lettermen's Club, Key Club, Children Are Reason Enough (CARE) club, Interact club, Community Emergency Response Team, Students working against tobacco (SWAT) club, Web Club, foreign-language clubs, National Honor Society and French Honors Society.

Naval Junior Reserve Officer Training Corps (NJROTC) 
The NJROTC unit was established and is maintained by the United States Navy as a citizenship program with a focus on developing leadership characteristics in students. Students in NJROTC wear a modified U.S. Navy uniform once a week and must pass a physical education test once every nine weeks as part of the curriculum. Apart from traditional classwork, students are encouraged to participate in a number of extracurricular activities, including an athletic team, academic team, drill team, color guard and a number of community service organizations including the American Legion and Rotary Club. Student leaders are in direct control of the affairs of the unit and are supervised by two retired United States Navy instructors.  The unit is a part of NJROTC Area Seven, which includes the majority of schools with NJROTC programs in the southeast United States.

Model United Nations 
The Model United Nations club on campus focuses on involving students in a moot form of international debate. The club participates in a number of competitions against schools statewide and has achieved success in a number of these competitions, including at the University of Florida, University of Central Florida, Florida Gulf Coast University and the Florida High School Model United Nations (FHSMUN). The school was a founding member of the competition held at Florida Gulf Coast University, the Southwest Florida Model United Nations Competition. The club also participates in charitable causes.

Theater arts 
The theater program allows students to participate in a number of productions by enrolling in an elective class. Students produce several productions during the school year, including musicals during the summer and winter in which elementary and junior high students participate. Productions have included Kiss Me, Kate, The Sound of Music, West Side Story, The Music Man, Anything Goes, Seussical the Musical, Les Misérables, Swing!, Carousel, Hello, Dolly!, South Pacific, Guys and Dolls, You're a Good Man, Charlie Brown, Aida, Oklahoma!, Thoroughly Modern Millie, Cats, Grease, The Wedding Singer, Beautiful, Footloose, South Pacific and How to Succeed In Business Without Really Trying.  The thespian troupe 05–257 at the school has achieved success at district, state and national level.

Music programs 

The school's band is made up of a marching band, symphonic band, percussion ensemble and jazz band. The marching band, known as the Marching Mantas, performs a half-time show during school football games and competes against other schools at statewide competitions. The symphonic band consists of only woodwind, brass and percussion instruments, with no string section or string players participating. Both the symphonic and jazz bands are rated on their progress and quality of performance each year by their district Florida Bandmaster's Association.

Students may participate in the symphonic and jazz bands by enrolling in an elective class and may participate in the marching band and percussion ensemble as extracurricular activities without a required class.

The Marching Mantas participated in the Orange Bowl in Miami, Florida, in January 2007.

Athletics 

Fall season sports at LBHS include junior varsity and varsity swimming, American football, golf, volleyball, cheerleading and cross country running. During the winter season, sports include soccer, basketball and wrestling. During the spring season, students can participate in baseball, softball, tennis, track and field and weightlifting. The school has long-standing rivalries with nearby Venice, Charlotte and Port Charlotte high schools. Lemon Bay wrestling has won two state championships, in 1998 and 1999.

Notable alumni 
 Denise Amber Lee - was kidnapped, raped and murdered on January 17, 2008, despite calls to 9-1-1, leading to the passing of legislation to require more training for 911 operators.
 J. D. Barker - author of numerous best selling suspense novels, graduated in 1989.
 Caroline Maun - professor, author, poet, lyricist and musician, graduated in 1986.
 Felicia Spencer - professional mixed martial artist.

References 

High schools in Charlotte County, Florida
Public high schools in Florida
Educational institutions established in 1972
1972 establishments in Florida